Zeelst is a former village in the Dutch province of North Brabant, now a neighbourhood of Veldhoven.

Zeelst was a separate municipality until 1921, when it became part of Veldhoven.

Notable people 
 Tiny Kox (b. 1953), politician

References

External links 
 Map of the former municipality in 1868

Former municipalities of North Brabant
Populated places in North Brabant
Veldhoven